Salford South was a parliamentary constituency in the City of Salford in Greater Manchester from 1885 until 1950. It returned one Member of Parliament (MP)  to the House of Commons of the Parliament of the United Kingdom.

History 
The constituency was created for the 1885 general election by the Redistribution of Seats Act 1885, which split the two-member Salford constituency into three divisions: Salford North, Salford South and Salford West.  It was abolished for the 1950 general election.

Boundaries

1885–1918 
The constituency of Salford, South Division was created by the Redistribution of Seats Act 1885, and consisted of the following wards of the Borough of Salford: Crescent, Islington, Ordsall,
St. Stephen's, and the part of Regent Ward east of the centre of Trafford Road.

1918–1950 
The Representation of the People Act 1918 reorganised constituencies throughout Great Britain and Ireland. Salford South was redefined as consisting of seven wards of the county borough of Salford: Crescent, Islington, Ordsall, Regent, Trafford, Trinity and Weaste.

Abolition 
The next redistribution of parliamentary constituencies took place under the Representation of the People Act 1948, and this led to the abolition of the Salford South constituency. Its area was divided between the borough constituencies of Salford East and Salford West.

Members of Parliament

Election results

Elections in the 1880s

Elections in the 1890s

Elections in the 1900s

Elections in the 1910s 

General Election 1914–15:

Another General Election was required to take place before the end of 1915. The political parties had been making preparations for an election to take place and by July 1914, the following candidates had been selected;
Unionist:  Anderson Barlow
Liberal: Francis Benedict Vincent Norris

Elections in the 1920s

Elections in the 1930s 

General Election 1939–40

Another General Election was required to take place before the end of 1940. The political parties had been making preparations for an election to take place and by the Autumn of 1939, the following candidates had been selected;
Conservative: John Stourton
Labour:

Elections in the 1940s

References 

 

Parliamentary constituencies in North West England (historic)
Constituencies of the Parliament of the United Kingdom established in 1885
Constituencies of the Parliament of the United Kingdom disestablished in 1950
Politics of Salford